Clarence Larkin (1850–1924) was an American Baptist pastor, Bible teacher and author whose writings on Dispensationalism had a great impact on conservative Protestant visual culture in the 20th century. His intricate and influential charts provided readers with a visual strategy for mapping God's action in history and for interpreting complex biblical prophecies.

Biography
Larkin was born on October 28, 1850, in Chester, Delaware County, Pennsylvania. He experienced conversion at the age of 19. He then got a job in a bank. When he was 21 years old, he left the bank and went to college, graduating as a mechanical engineer. He continued as a professional draftsman for a while, then he became a teacher of the blind. This last endeavor cultivated his descriptive faculties, while his drafter's training influenced his artistic style. Later, failing health compelled him to give up his teaching career. After a prolonged rest, he became a manufacturer.

When he was converted he had become a member of the Episcopal Church, but in 1882, at the age of 32, his position on baptism was challenged and for two years he studied the subject. As a result, he left his church and became a Baptist. He wrote the book Why I Am a Baptist as part of that study. He became a Baptist and was ordained as a Baptist minister two years later, going directly from business into the ministry. Larkin's first pastorate was at Kennett Square, Pennsylvania; his second was at Fox Chase, Pennsylvania, where he remained for 20 years. His study of the Scriptures led him to adopt many of the tenets of the premillennialist theology that was gaining favor in conservative Protestant circles in the Gilded Age. He began to make large wall charts, which he titled "Prophetic Truth," for use in the pulpit. These led to invitations to teach elsewhere. During this time he published a number of prophetical charts, which were widely circulated and contributed articles for the Sunday School Times.

In 1918, he completed Dispensational Truth, but high demand for the work led him to produce a greatly expanded edition of 1920. Larkin was an advocate of gap creationism.

Notable works
Larkin's first major publication was Dispensational Truth (or God's Plan and Purpose in the Ages), which contained dozens of charts and hundreds of pages. The preparation of the charts and text took Larkin three years to produce.  The book is a defense of premillennialist dispensationalism that draws on the major themes found in the works of figures like C.I. Scofield, William Eugene Blackstone, and John Nelson Darby.

After the second printing of Dispensational Truth, Larkin revised and expanded it, releasing it in its present form of over 300 pages. Following this initial success, Larkin published five additional works: Rightly Dividing the Word; The Book of Daniel; Spirit World; Second Coming of Christ; and A Medicine Chest for Christian Practitioners, a handbook on evangelism.

Like C. I. Scofield, he postulated seven separate dispensations—the current being the "Dispensation of Grace," "Church Dispensation," "Ecclesiastical Dispensation," or "Parenthetical Dispensation."  This position held that the church age filled a "gap" in the timeline of biblical prophecy.

Later years
Larkin disliked the tendency of writers to say uncharitable things about each other, so he sought to avoid criticisms and to satisfy himself with presenting his understanding of the Scriptures. During the last five years of his life, the demand for Larkin's books made it necessary for him to give up the pastorate and devote his full-time to writing. He died on January 24, 1924.

References

External links
 
 Rev. Historic Sketch of the author Clarence Larkin
 Clarence Larkin Biography
 Clarence Larkin's Charts Online
 Clarence Larkin's book Dispensational Truth online with charts and images
 Clarence Larkin's books and charts in Bible software format

1850 births
1924 deaths
19th-century American male writers
19th-century Baptists
20th-century American male writers
20th-century Baptists
American Christian creationists
Baptists from Pennsylvania
Baptist writers
Converts to Baptist denominations
Former Anglicans
Premillennialism
Writers from Pennsylvania